Elwood Thomas Baker (1854 – November 22, 1938) and his son, Charles Graham Baker, invented Gin rummy in 1909.

Elwood was a whist teacher in Brooklyn, New York.

References

1853 births
1938 deaths
American gin players
20th-century American inventors
Board game designers
Card game players